Adolf Guggenbühl-Craig (1923, in Zurich, Switzerland – 18 July 2008) was a Swiss psychiatrist and analytical psychologist, member of the archetypal school of Jungian analysis. He was the author of many publications.

Life 
Guggenbühl-Craig was the son of the well respected Zurich publisher, Adolf Guggenbühl. He studied theology at Zurich University with the idea of becoming a pastor, then worked at his father's publishing firm. He went on to work as an auxiliary social worker while on the side studying philosophy and history at the University of Basel. He finally decided to study Medicine at Zurich and directly after taking his final exam, left for America where he took on various house jobs. After a spell of four years in the United States, where he had entered a Freudian analysis on Rhode Island, he returned to his homeland and specialised in Psychiatry. He began a Jungian analysis with Franz Niklaus Riklin, son of Franz Beda Riklin, which did not preclude his adherence to Christianity, and studied at the C. G. Jung Institute, Zürich, but left without a diploma. He subsequently opened a private Psychotherapy practice in Zurich. During that period he met the American Jungian follower, James Hillman, who was highly critical of Guggenbühl's status as a practitioner without a diploma, but he overcame the prejudice and the two men became friends. He was married to Scottish sculptor and singer, Anne Craig (1929-2018). He added her surname to his, at her request, to distinguish himself from his father. They had five children one of whom, their son, became a psychotherapist.

He was personally acquainted with Jung, and greatly influenced by his work, although he did not care either for the man, his adulation nor for his acolytes. He was a lecturer and director of the C. G. Jung Institute, Zürich for ten years. Later he served as president of the IAAP. From his practice in Switzerland he made numerous contributions to analytical psychology. He influenced a great many Jungians all round the world, based on his work as a psychotherapist, analyst and teacher. He was the author of numerous articles and sought after books.

He died at the age of 85.

His papers are lodged with the OPUS Archives and Research Center, Pacifica Graduate Institute in Carpinteria, California.

Works 
 Marriage: dead or alive
 Power in the helping professions
 The emptied soul. On the nature of the psychopath
 Marriage is dead – Long live marriage!
 The old fool and the corruption of myth, featured in a documentary film by Stephen Segaller.
 From the wrong side. A paradoxical approach to psychology

See also 
 James Hillman

References

Bibliography 
In English

External links 

  Adolf Guggenbühl-Craig works at Spring Publications
 Archetypal Psychology archives in Brazil
 Musical and pictorial tribute to Adolf Guggenbühl-Craig by his son, Allan

1923 births
2008 deaths
Scientists from Zürich
Jungian psychologists
20th-century Swiss writers
20th-century psychologists
University of Zurich alumni
Psychology writers
Swiss psychiatrists
Swiss psychologists
Symbologists
University of Basel alumni
Swiss expatriates in the United States